Crepidodera is a genus of flea beetles in the family Chrysomelidae. There some 40 described species worldwide.

Selected species

 Crepidodera aereola (J. L. LeConte, 1857) i c g b
 Crepidodera aurata (Marsham, 1802) g
 Crepidodera aurea (Geoffroy, 1785) g
 Crepidodera aureola (Foudras, 1861) g
 Crepidodera bella Parry, 1986 i c g b
 Crepidodera bicolor Boheman, 1859 g
 Crepidodera browni Parry, 1986 i c g b
 Crepidodera brullei Montrouzier, 1861 g
 †Crepidodera decolorata Nadein & Perkovsky, 2010 g
 Crepidodera decora Parry, 1986 i c g
 Crepidodera digna Parry, 1986 i c g
 Crepidodera fulvicornis (Fabricius, 1792) g
 Crepidodera heikertingeri (Lazorko, 1974) i c g b
 Crepidodera impressa (Fabricius, 1801) g
 Crepidodera lamina (Bedel, 1901) g
 Crepidodera longula Horn, 1889 i c g
 Crepidodera luminosa Parry, 1986 i c g b
 Crepidodera nana (Say, 1824) i c g b (tiny aspen flea beetle)
 Crepidodera nigricoxis Allard, 1878 g
 Crepidodera nitidula (Linnaeus, 1758) g
 Crepidodera opulenta J. L. LeConte, 1858 i c g
 Crepidodera peloponnesiaca (Heikertinger, 1910) g
 Crepidodera plutus (Latreille, 1804) g
 Crepidodera populivora Parry, 1986 i c g b
 Crepidodera sahalinensis Konstantinov, 1996
 Crepidodera sculpturata (Lazorko, 1974) i c g
 Crepidodera solita Parry, 1986 i c g b
 Crepidodera spenceri (Lazorko, 1974) i c g
 Crepidodera stypheliae Samuelson, 1984
 Crepidodera sublaevis
 Crepidodera svetlanae Bukejs, 2014 g
 Crepidodera ussuriensis Konstantinov, 1996
 Crepidodera vaga Parry, 1986 i c g
 Crepidodera violacea F. E. Melsheimer, 1847 i c g b

Data sources: i = ITIS, c = Catalogue of Life, g = GBIF, b = Bugguide.net

References

Alticini
Chrysomelidae genera
Taxa named by Louis Alexandre Auguste Chevrolat